Grassmann, Graßmann or Grassman is a German surname. Notable people with the surname include:

 Grassmann
 Dietrich Graßmann (1920–1991), German Luftwaffe pilot
 Hans Grassmann (born 1960), German physicist
 Hermann Grassmann (1809–1877), German polymath
 Justus Grassmann (died 1961), German World War I flying ace
 Marcelo Grassmann (1925–2013), Brazilian engraver and draughtsman
 Thomas Grassmann (1890–1970), American historian and archaeologist

 Grassman
 Edward Grassman (1882–1952), American politician

See also

 Grossmann (surname)

German-language surnames